"Diary of a Madman" (1835; Russian: Записки сумасшедшего, Zapiski sumasshedshevo) is a farcical short story by Nikolai Gogol. Along with "The Overcoat" and "The Nose", "Diary of a Madman" is considered to be one of Gogol's greatest short stories. The tale centers on the life of a minor civil servant during the era of Nicholas I. The story shows the descent of the protagonist, Poprishchin, into insanity. "Diary of a Madman", the only one of Gogol's works written in first person, follows diary-entry format.

Plot introduction

Although nineteenth century medical authorities noted the accuracy of Gogol's depiction of the course of madness, the text itself (with the exception of the title) never crosses the boundary into objectification. Everything is told exclusively from the point of view of the protagonist, and conclusions about him and what is happening to him can only ever be inferred from the solipsistic and increasingly fantastic narrative of events and thoughts recorded in his diary. The entries haphazardly mix a past tense recounting of events of the day with present time registering of thoughts and associations relating to them. It begins with a standard date-based diary format, but at a certain point even the dates take on an irrational form, as if the writer's sense of conventional time has dissolved.

Plot summary

October 3rd. 
Poprishchin records that he rose late from bed and was reluctant to go to the office to face the disapproval of the chief clerk who habitually tells him he is muddle-headed and incompetent. He puts this down to the "long-legged scoundrel's" envy of his position as the mender of pens in the director's office. He had gone, however, because he wanted to see the accountant about obtaining an advance on his salary, though he knew that the accountant would not oblige as he is an inveterate "skinflint".
He reflects sourly on other officials and the pointlessness of serving in his department, although he is pleased that the tables are mahogany and everyone is addressed as "sir". On his way to work, he had seen the director's daughter go into a shop. He was completely overcome by her beauty, but he effaced himself, not wanting to be seen in his inferior clothes. To his great astonishment, he overheard her little dog Meggie, who had been left outside, engaging in conversation with another passing dog called Fidel. He quickly reminded himself that such things are not unheard of, and recalled reading about a fish that put its head out of the water and spoke in a strange language and two cows who entered a shop to ask for a pound of tea. He was even more astonished to hear Meggie tell Fidel that she has written him a letter, and he resolves to follow Fidel and her owner home to ascertain their address.

October 4th. 
Today he was in the office as usual, mending pens. He reflects on the nobility of his director, and begins to dream about the director's daughter, before abruptly cutting himself off. Instead he contemplates the folly of the French, to whom he would like to administer a thrashing, and his admiration for the landowners of Kursk, who write very elegantly. That morning, the director's daughter had walked in, and he was again overwhelmed by her beauty and splendid clothes. He longed to tell her not to have him executed but to kill him with her own hand, but instead informed her that her father wasn't there. She dropped her handkerchief and he nearly broke his nose trying to retrieve it. When she left, a flunkey told him that he could also leave, as the director wouldn't be in. Although he despises lackeys and their lack of respect for his official status and aristocratic birth, he left regardless. At home he lay on his bed for a long time. In the evening he went to the director's house and waited outside in hopes of seeing his beloved, but she didn't appear.

November 6th. 
He is deeply upset: the chief clerk has castigated him in a most insulting manner for running after the director's daughter. He inwardly curses and polemicises with the chief clerk, putting his high-handedness down to envy, and to the conceit that comes with combing his hair a certain way and wearing gold chains and expensive boots. He proclaims his own noble heritage and asserts that his achievements could soon "eclipse" those of the chief clerk, if only he had a fashionable coat like him. But unfortunately, he laments, he has no money.

November 8th. 
Poprishchin was at the theatre watching a musical comedy that greatly entertained him. He particularly enjoyed the play's barbs directed at barristers, merchants, critics and others. He expresses contempt for his fellow officials who lack the sophistication needed to enjoy theatre. One actress sang beautifully and reminded him of... he admonishes himself to silence.

November 9th. 
He went to the office at 8 o'clock. He and the chief clerk pretended not to notice each other's existence. He left at 4 and passed by the director's house but saw no-one. After dinner he lay on the bed for a long time.

November 11th. 
Today he mended 23 pens for His Excellency and 4 more for his daughter. He expresses great admiration for the director's intelligence and quiet dignity, and laments his own inability to communicate his curiosity about the director's social circles. He wishes he could look into the other rooms and observe the elegance and splendour, in particular the daughter's boudoir, with its flowers and scent bottles and "ethereal" clothes. But again he commands himself to be silent. He remembered the conversation between the two dogs and decided that he must get hold of the correspondence between them. He had already once accosted Meggie and demanded information about her mistress, but the cunning animal had quietly left the room without saying anything. He expresses his long-held opinion that dogs are cleverer than men and are extraordinarily observant animals. He resolves to go to Fidel's house to retrieve the letters.

November 12th. 
He had returned to Fidel's place of lodging and asked the girl that he be allowed to speak to her dog. The dog had come running and barking, and when he tried to pick it up it attempted to bite his nose. Seeing the animal's sleeping basket, he rushed in, rummaged through it, and succeeded in snatching a bunch of papers before hastily departing, to the dog's chagrin and the girl's extreme alarm.

He is convinced that the letters between the dogs will tell him everything he wishes to know about the character of the director, and also give him information about she who... he silences himself.

November 13th. 
Poprishchin records verbatim the contents of Meggie's letters to Fidel. The letters frustrate him because, despite being perfectly legible and grammatically correct, they dwell too much on trivial canine matters, and on those occasions when they do begin to discuss the director or his daughter, they always sidetrack into something peculiarly doggy in nature. However, he does learn from Meggie's anecdotes that the director is ambitious, and that Sophie (the director's daughter) attended a ball and returned at 6 in the morning, excited and exhausted. Meggie describes Sophie's delight the next day when she receives a gentleman visitor called Mr Teploff. The dog adds that she can't understand what her mistress sees in him: Poprishchin likewise becomes somewhat alarmed. Meggie then alludes to the comical official who sits in the director's waiting room mending pens, who is, according to Meggie, an object of ridicule to Sophie. Realizing it is himself being referred to, Poprishchin becomes enraged and accuses the "cursed dog" of lying and of being motivated by envy. He puts it down to treachery on the part of the chief clerk.

He decides to read one more letter and learns that Sophie is now madly in love with the young "chamberlain", that they are engaged, and that the father is very happy.

December 3rd. 
Poprishchin cannot accept that the marriage will take place. He expresses dismay at the false status accorded to someone who happens to be a 'chamberlain', pointing out that his nose isn't made of gold and is just like anyone else's. He wonders where such distinctions came from, and why he himself is only a titular councillor. He speculates that he might really be a count or a general, observing that such cases of mistaken identity are not historically infrequent. What would his beloved and her father say if he suddenly appeared in a general's uniform? He expresses contempt for the director's ambition and decides that he must be a freemason.

December 5th. 
Poprishchin has discovered from the newspapers that the throne of Spain is vacant, and that there is no heir-apparent. He is mystified that there can be a throne, but no-one to sit on it.

December 8th. 
He is still deeply troubled by the Spanish affairs. He doesn't go to the office and spends most of the day lying on his bed pondering the situation.

The year 2000: April 43rd. 
Poprishchin triumphantly announces that the King of Spain has been found and that it is in fact himself. He cannot understand how he can have imagined that he was a titular councillor, but he thinks it might have been due to thinking the human brain is in the head when in fact it is carried by the wind from the Caspian Sea. He reports that Mawra (his maidservant) was shocked and frightened when he informed her that he was the King of Spain, but he had hastened to assure her that he was nothing like Phillip II. He didn't go to the office and scornfully rules out ever going there again.

Marchember 86. Between day and night. 
Poprishchin records that today he was summoned to the office since he hadn't been in for three weeks. He had sat serenely at his desk, amused at how shocked everyone would be if they knew who was in their presence. Work was put in front of him, but naturally he ignored it. Eventually the director himself appeared and Poprishchin was given a special document to sign: he wrote "Ferdinand VIII" in bold letters and a reverential silence had ensued. He then left and made his way to the director's house, forcing his way in and going straight to Sophie's dressing room where he had told her that at last they would be united, despite their enemies' treachery, and that unimaginable happiness awaited her. He had then departed.

He has discovered that woman loves only one thing: the devil. The devil is behind everything that attracts a woman's attention, and in the end she marries him. He concludes that it is all ambition, and the reason is a tiny worm that lives in a blister under the tongue, which is constructed by a barber in Bean Street, and a midwife, who are seeking to spread the Islamic faith.

No date. The day had no date. 
He went for a walk "incognito", feeling it beneath his dignity to be recognized in the world when he had not yet presented at court. He realized that he needed a royal cloak, but since the tailor he consulted proved an incompetent ass, he decides that he will make it himself. He later reports that he has succeeded in making the cloak out of his office uniform and that Mawra cried out when he put it on. He impatiently awaits the arrival of the Spanish deputation so that he may present himself.

The 1st 
He is astonished at the delay in the arrival of the Spanish deputies. That morning he had gone to the post office to inquire whether they had arrived yet. The "blockhead" of a postmaster told him that they had not, but that he would be happy to forward a letter to them if desired.

Madrid. February 30th. 
He is in Spain. The Spanish deputies had arrived early that morning and, with extraordinary promptness, transported him to the Spanish frontier. Upon entering, he had seen many persons with shaved heads whom he decided must be grandees or soldiers. The State Chancellor had pushed him into a small room and threatened to beat him if he called himself Ferdinand VIII again, but Poprishchin, knowing it was a test, repeated his assertion, whereupon he was dealt two blows with a stick. Though painful, it hadn't troubled him because he knew it was merely an ancient chivalric ceremony for those being inducted into high office. Later, researching state affairs, he discovered that Spain and China are in fact the same country. He also became deeply troubled by an impending event: He succeeded in convincing the "grandees with shorn heads" to take urgent action to save the moon, but the Imperial Chancellor responded by beating him and driving him into his room. Such, he concludes, is the power of ancient customs in Spain.

January in the same year, following after February. 
He is becoming increasingly astonished at the strangeness of Spanish customs. Today his head was shaved and they poured cold water on him, all the time ignoring his loud protestations. He fears that he might have fallen into the hands of the Inquisition and that the man he took to be the chancellor is in fact the Grand Inquisitor. He speculates that the affair has been arranged by France and England.

The 25th. 
Today the Grand Inquisitor came into his room, but he had hidden himself in advance. The Inquisitor called out his old name and official title several times before finally calling out "Ferdinand the Eighth, King of Spain!" and driving him out from under the chair with a stick. Poprishchin is compensated for his pain with the discovery that "every cock has his Spain under his feathers". He feels only contempt for the impotent spite of the Inquisitor whom he knows to be only a machine and a tool of the English.

34 March. February 349. 
He can no longer endure the torture and humiliation, and cries out for help. A heartfelt prayer to his mother for the suffering of her orphan son concludes with the words:

Themes

Madness
Gogol evokes common images of madness in his characterization of Poprischkin – auditory hallucination (the talking dogs), delusions of grandeur (thinking he is the King of Spain), and the institutional context of the asylum and its effect on the individual. In the second half of the nineteenth century, "Diary of a Madman" was frequently cited as a realistic case study: medical specialists wrote articles confirming its authenticity as an outline of the progress of paranoid delusion. The character has been described by psychiatrist Eric Lewin Altschuler as one of the earliest and most extensive depictions of what became known as schizophrenia. The image of the insane asylum as a house of correction, indirectly presented through Poprischkin's deranged diary entries, is also true to ideological perspectives and institutional practices pertaining to the treatment of madness in the era of European industrialization.

Poprishchin's descent into madness is a result of his alienation from society. His desire to achieve the dignity and authority that he sees around him, but never feels, yields frustration rather than motivation. His lack of motivation causes Poprishchin to wish for power and wealth, instead of actively trying to work toward achieving this goal in reality.

Poprishchin's relationship with three specific characters, the Director, the Section Chief and Sofi, contribute significantly to the disintegration of his sanity. The Section Chief causes Poprishchin the most direct frustration through constant criticism. Poprishchin responds to the Section Chief's attempts to bring him into reality with anger and aggression. The Director takes a much more passive role in affecting Poprishchin. Poprishchin actually idolizes the Director, in large part due to the fact that he remains distant from Poprishchin and never interferes in his personal life with comments or suggestions. Despite this initially peaceful relationship, Poprishchin finds a way to see a menace in the Director. Poprishchin notices that the Director has too much ambition, a quality that Poprishchin desires, but knows he cannot achieve in reality, and therefore turns his admiration of the Director into hatred. Sofi is a beautiful woman to whom Poprishchin has a strong sexual attraction. However, Poprishchin painfully discovers that Sofi finds him unattractive and irritable, and he is unable to cope. Poprishchin is enlightened about both the Director's ambition and Sofi's view of him from letters written by a dog. Poprishchin's imagination conjured the complimentary letter from Sofi, when, in reality, the letter neglects mentioning him. His destruction of the letter evidences his insanity by symbolizing his release of reality.

Alienation
One disruptive force contextualized is the relationship between the individual and society. Poprishchin sees a menace in everyone and always finds a way to blame others for his personal frustrations, and consequently treats them with the aggression he believes they deserve. This behavior fuels a vicious cycle that justifies the negative perception and treatment that society exerts toward Poprishchin.

Numbers
There have been many analyses of Poprishchin's unique diary entries attempting to interpret their meaning, with special interest taken in the entry: 43 April 2000. A Freudian analysis performed by Ermakov hypothesized that Poprishchin used this absurd date to avoid May 13, because the word maja suggests majat'sja, which in Russian means suffering. Richard Gustafson's analysis of the entry title is more grounded in the contents of the story. He agrees that Poprishchin is indeed trying to avoid May 13, but his reasoning is that the letters from the dogs that exposed the grave reality of Sofi and the Director were presented exactly half a year earlier on November 13.

Influence
The Chinese writer Lu Xun was well acquainted with Russian literature and wrote a story with a similar premise to, and the same title as, Gogol's. 

The story's name was reflected in Lina Kostenko's novel Notes of a Ukrainian Madman, which makes frequent references to Gogol's writings.

Adaptions
David Holman adapted it into a play; the 2010 production in Sydney starred Geoffrey Rush.

References

External links

 
Online text (Russian) from public-library.ru
Translation of the story on Project Gutenberg

Short stories by Nikolai Gogol
1835 short stories
Fictional diaries
Fiction with unreliable narrators
Short stories set in the Russian Empire